The acronym LOFAR may refer to:

 Low-Frequency Array (LOFAR): A large radio telescope system, based in the Netherlands
 Low Frequency Analyzer and Recorder (LOFAR) equipment and Low Frequency Analysis and Recording (LOFAR) process; associated terms referring to processing and display low-frequency underwater sounds in the Sound Surveillance System (SOSUS) and antisubmarine warfare
 Low Frequency Analysis and Ranging (LOFAR) as applied to some SONAR systems